Have or having may refer to:
 the concept of ownership
 any concept of possession; see Possession (disambiguation)
 the English verb "to ", used:
 to express  possession linguistically, in a broad sense
 as an auxiliary verb; see English auxiliaries and contractions
 in constructions such as have something done; see  
  Having (album), a 2006 album by the band Trespassers William
 Having (SQL), a clause in the SQL programming-language
 Having (inlet), on Rügen island in Germany
 HAVE, a United States military code-word designating projects developed by the Air Force Systems Command, such as the Lockheed Have Blue

See also
 Has (disambiguation)
 Had (disambiguation)
 
 

Verbs